Can't Ban Tha Truth is a 2010 mixtape released by American rapper Trae tha Truth. It was hosted by Evil Empire and DJ Folk.

Track listing
 "Can't Ban Tha Truth Intro"                                                                                                    3:47
 "Can't Ban Tha Truth" (featuring Young Quis & Brian Angel)                                                      3:30
 "Gin Cop A Drop"                                                                                                               4:09
 "Lil Duval Speaks"                                                                                                             0:38
 "General" (featuring Brian Angel)                                                                               4:41
 "Hood Nights" (featuring Gudda Gudda & Jae Millz)                                                           3:16
 "Duece's & Trae's" (featuring Young Buck & Big Pokey)                                                   4:49
 "I Got This" (featuring Young Jeezy)                                                                        3:43
 "Mama C Speaks"                                                                                                                2:36
 "The Radio Wont Play This" (featuring Wyclef)                                                               4:05
 "Bad Dont Seem So Wrong" (featuring Lupe Fiasco)                                                            4:41
 "Pimp C Speaks On 97.9"                                                                                                        2:46
 "Thats Fo Real"                                                                                                                3:45
 "Gangsta 4 Life" (featuring Rihanna)                                                                        3:14
 "Young Turk Calls From Jail"                                                                                                   1:35
 "Please Respect It"                                                                                                            4:20
 "Tear"                                                                                                                         3:47
 "Still My Nigga"                                                                                                               4:02
 "What It Is"                                                                                                                   3:35

References

2010 mixtape albums
Trae tha Truth albums